Aleut Ka (Ԟ ԟ; italics: Ԟ ԟ) is a letter of the Cyrillic script. It is formed from the Cyrillic letter Ka (К к) by adding a stroke to the upper diagonal arm.

Aleut Ka was used in the alphabet of the Aleut language in the 19th century, where it represented the voiceless uvular plosive . During the revival of the Aleut Cyrillic alphabet in the 1980s it has been replaced by the Ka with hook.

Computing codes

See also
Other Cyrillic letters used to write the sound :
Қ қ : Cyrillic letter Ka with descender
Ӄ ӄ : Cyrillic letter Ka with hook
Ҡ ҡ : Cyrillic letter Bashkir Qa
Ԛ ԛ : Cyrillic letter Qa
Cyrillic characters in Unicode